The Parvin Bridge is a covered bridge located in Lane County, Oregon, U.S. near Dexter.  It was built in 1921 as a single-lane  bridge across Lost Creek, a tributary of the Middle Fork Willamette River.

The bridge was a replacement for a  Howe truss design which failed a 1917 inspection by bridge inspector J. W. McArthur.  He wrote, "An old bridge. Chords badly worm eaten.  Downstream chord has been reinforced in middle by a timber bolted on.  Wood is but little better than a powder from worm action.  All signs indicate a new bridge in from 2 to 4 years."

George W. Breeding constructed the present bridge at the same site in 1921 for $3,617, equivalent to $ today.  It is also a Howe truss and includes a  eastern approach and a  western approach.  Roadwork in the mid-1970s realigned the road to bypass the bridge, being accessible only to pedestrians afterwards.  A dedication ceremony was held November 17, 1986, to reopen the renovated span to vehicle traffic with a  load limit.

The Parvin Bridge is listed on the National Register of Historic Places.

See also
 List of bridges on the National Register of Historic Places in Oregon
 List of Oregon covered bridges
 National Register of Historic Places listings in Lane County, Oregon

References

1921 establishments in Oregon
Covered bridges on the National Register of Historic Places in Oregon
Covered bridges in Lane County, Oregon
National Register of Historic Places in Lane County, Oregon
Road bridges on the National Register of Historic Places in Oregon
Wooden bridges in Oregon
Howe truss bridges in the United States